Edmund Blackett Owen, FRCS (1847–1915) was an English surgeon.

Biography

He was the third son of a practicing doctor of Finchingfield, Essex and educated in nearby Bishops Stortford.

After studying medicine at St Mary's Hospital, London, Owen was appointed Resident Medical Officer and Demonstrator of Anatomy at St Mary's in 1868 and Lecturer of Anatomy in 1876. He was made M.R.C.S. in 1868 and F.R.C.S. in 1876. He also studied medicine in Paris and was made Chevalier de la Légion d'honneur. For many years he was a surgeon at both St Mary's Hospital and the Hospital for Sick Children, Great Ormond Street.

He was elected President of the Harveian Society in 1887 and President of the Medical Society of London in 1898.

Honours
1887 — President of the Harveian Society 
1898 — President of the Medical Society of London
7 March 1900 - Knight of Grace of the Order of St John of Jerusulem
1903 — Cross of the Legion of Honor
1906 — Bradshaw Lecture to Royal College of Surgeons
1911 — Hunterian Oration to Royal College of Surgeons

Family
Owen was married in 1882 and his wife died in 1906. Upon his own death in 1915 he was survived by four daughters.

Books

References

External links

Edmund Owen, Innes Smith Medical Portrait, Digital Special Collections

19th-century English medical doctors
20th-century English medical doctors
Fellows of the Royal College of Surgeons
People from Finchingfield
1847 births
1915 deaths